Ustyurt Nature Reserve (Üstırt memlekettık tabiği qoryğy; , Ustyurt natsional'nyy zapovednik), or the Ustyurt National Biosphere Reserve, is a nature reserve, created on 12 July 1984 in what was then the Kazakh Soviet Socialist Republic (K.S.S.R.), in Mangystau Region, southwest Kazakhstan. The reserve lies near the borders with Uzbekistan and Turkmenistan. Its purpose is to preserve the deserts as well as the rare flora and fauna. The Sherkala mountain and the Valley of Balls lie within the reserve. In addition, it contains a big variety of flora and fauna.

Climate

The temperatures vary greatly: from more than  during the summer months, down to less than  during the winter months. The average annual precipitation is only .

Flora and fauna

There are 250 species of flora from 163 different genera and families within the reserve, such as cactus, grey sage, feather grass, anabasis-salsa and saltwort. 37 of the species come from the family Chenopodiaceae.

About 44 species of mammal live within the reserve, including many rare animals, such as the Ustyurt mouflon, saiga antelope, jeyran, fox and polecat. Wolves and jackals can also be found, along with the weasel and ferret. The saiga, Persian gazelle and Ustyurt mouflon are considered to only live around Ustyurt and Mangyshlak.

In September 2021, wolves, jackals, mountain rams, caracals, and other animals were caught on camera in the Ustyurt Nature Reserve.

Landscape

Ustyurt Nature Reserve contains a big variety of landscapes, from steppes and depressions to pillars reaching several hundred metres in height. The pillars can be several colours, including pale pink, blue and dazzling white. The vast Kenderlisor depression spans the entire length of the reserve, from the southwest to the northeast. Shakhr-i-Vazir, an ancient city, also lies in the reserve, along with dozens of Neolithic sites.

References

Nature reserves in Kazakhstan
Mangystau Region